Third Eye is a 2014 Filipino horror film directed by Aloy Adlawan and starring Carla Abellana, Camille Prats, Ejay Falcon and Denise Laurel. It was produced by Regal Entertainment.

Synopsis
When Mylene (Carla Abellana) was a young child she witnessed the grisly death of her neighbor and her parents. She discovers soon after that she has the ability to see the dead. Her grandmother chooses to close her third eye, protecting her for the time being from the horrors of seeing spirits. But with the death of her grandmother, Mylene's third eye reopens. It is an ability that she must come to grips with, as she, in pursuit of her adulterous husband, inadvertently travels into dark, dangerous territory populated by a community of murderous practitioners of black magic.

Cast
Carla Abellana as Mylene
Camille Prats as Susan
Ejay Falcon as Jimmy
Denise Laurel as Janet
Alex Medina as Cenon
Boots Anson-Roa as Gloria
Dimples Romana  as Belen
Cai Cortez as Ryzza
Mosang as Aludia
Robert Correa as Nanding
Rain Quite as Ram Ram 
Patricia Joanne Coma as Young Mylene

Production

See also
List of ghost films

References

External links
 

2014 films
Philippine horror films
2010s Tagalog-language films
Mosang films
Regal Entertainment films
2010s English-language films